Pierre Lacroix  may refer to:

 Pierre Lacroix (theologian), French 18th century theologian
 Pierre Lacroix (rugby union) (1935–2019), French rugby union player for SU Agen Lot-et-Garonne
 Pierre Lacroix (ice hockey, born 1948), former NHL General Manager and team president
 Pierre Lacroix (ice hockey, born 1959), retired Canadian ice hockey player